Gregg Sulkin (born 29 May 1992) is a British actor. He made his film debut in the 2002 Doctor Zhivago mini-series. He later starred in the 2006 British release Sixty Six, and subsequently appeared in the Disney Channel comedy series As the Bell Rings and Wizards of Waverly Place. In 2010, he starred in the Disney Channel television film Avalon High. He also appeared in the television special The Wizards Return: Alex vs. Alex. He starred on MTV's show Faking It as Liam Booker from 2014 until its cancellation in 2016. He also appeared on Pretty Little Liars as Ezra's brother, Wesley "Wes" Fitzgerald. In 2016, he starred in the role of Sam Fuller in the horror-thriller film Don't Hang Up. He starred as Chase Stein in the TV show Runaways, based on the Marvel Comics series of the same name.

Early life
Sulkin was born in Westminster, London. He is Jewish and had his Bar Mitzvah at the Western Wall in Jerusalem. He attended Highgate School in North London.

Career
Sulkin made his acting debut in the 2002 mini-series Doctor Zhivago. He subsequently starred in the comedy Sixty Six, as Bernie Rubens, alongside Helena Bonham Carter, Eddie Marsan and Catherine Tate. Sulkin also played the role of JJ in the Disney Channel comedy, As the Bell Rings, worked on a CBBC children sci-fi show The Sarah Jane Adventures (spin-off of Doctor Who), playing Adam in series 3 two-episode story The Mad Woman in the Attic.

Sulkin was part of Disney Channel's Pass the Plate as Gregg from the UK. He had a recurring guest role on the Disney Channel series Wizards of Waverly Place, where he played Alex's love interest Mason Greyback he reprised his role in 4 episodes of season 3 and returned to the series in its fourth season, and through to its finale. Sulkin has also landed a role in the thriller The Heavy.

In 2010, he went to New Zealand to film the Disney Channel Original Movie Avalon High, which premiered on 12 November 2010. In an interview with Kyle Martino, aired on Soccer Talk Live on the Fox Soccer Channel in the US, Sulkin announced that he was a fan of Arsenal. Sulkin participated the Disney Channel's Friends for Change Games and was on the Yellow Team. He reprised his role as Mason Greyback in The Wizards Return: Alex vs. Alex which premiered on Disney Channel in March 2013.

In 2012, Sulkin starred in the American teen drama series Pretty Little Liars as a recurring character, Wesley Fitzgerald, brother of Ezra Fitz. In February 2013, it was announced that Sulkin would play Julian Fineman in FOX's television adaptation of Lauren Oliver's young adult novel, Delirium. On 8 May, it was reported that Fox has decided not to pick up Delirium. From 2014 to 2016, Sulkin starred in the MTV comedy Faking It. Sulkin portrayed Liam Booker. Sulkin defeated Victoria Justice on 30 July 2015 episode of Spike's Lip Sync Battle, where he performed "I Believe in a Thing Called Love" by The Darkness before donning a wig and going shirtless to perform Kelis's "Milkshake".

Sulkin starred in the leading role of Sam Fuller in the horror-thriller film Don't Hang Up which was released in theatres on 10 February 2017.

Sulkin also played Chase Stein on Runaways, a Hulu series set in the Marvel Cinematic Universe.

Personal life
Sulkin became an American citizen on 23 May 2018. He retains his British citizenship.

Filmography

Film

Television

Music videos

Awards and nominations

References

External links

Gregg Sulkin at the Music Television
Gregg Sulkin

1992 births
English male child actors
English male film actors
English male television actors
Jewish English male actors
Living people
People from Swiss Cottage
Male actors from London
People educated at Highgate School
English emigrants to the United States
English people of Dutch-Jewish descent
People with acquired American citizenship